Circus of Fear ( / Mystery of the Silver Triangle), also Scotland Yard auf heißer Spur, also Circus of Terror) is a 1966 Anglo-German international co-production thriller film starring Christopher Lee, Suzy Kendall, Leo Genn and Cecil Parker.  The U.S. title was Psycho-Circus. It was based on the novel Again the Three Just Men by Edgar Wallace (1928).

It was shot at Hammer Film's Bray Studios in Berkshire and on location around London.The film was partially shot at Billy Smart's Circus. The film was co-produced by the leading German distributor Constantin Film, which was at the same time releasing Rialto Film's long-running series of Wallace adaptations in Germany. Several of the cast Heinz Drache, Eddi Arent and Klaus Kinski were regular performers in that series and were added to this production to appeal to German audiences. Werner Jacobs directed the version release in West Germany.

Plot

The film is set in London, mainly in the East End and docklands.

When an armoured car is robbed, in a daring daylight raid co-ordinated on Tower Bridge, one of the guards is shot and killed by Mason (Victor Maddern). The gang escape on the river.

Part of the gang escape northwards on the M1 motorway. The police catch up and force them off the road, killing one man. Meanwhile Mason dumps his car in a lake and takes a suitcase full of money to nearby buildings. An unseen knife-thrower kills Mason as he turns to leave.

We are introduced to the characters of Barberini's Circus, including Drago (Christopher Lee), who wears a full mask to hide his fire damaged face. Manfred (Klaus Kinski) arrives at the circus seeking employment. It is revealed that Mr Big (the midget) is blackmailing Drago. An unseen person unlocks the lion and it almost kills one of the circus girls.

The police are led to the circus but also require to investigate a body found with a knife next to it. The police interview the girl who was attacked by the lion and soon after is herself murdered by a thrown knife.

The police (naturally) interview the circus knife-thrower.

Drago confesses to his niece that he found a suitcase of money and hid it. Manfred is the next victim of the knife-thrower who this time also sets a fire.

A police manhunt causes Drago to fall to his death and the suitcase of money is retrieved. However, detective Elliot (Leo Genn) decides this is not the killer. His examination of all the clues leads to a final denouement in front of the assembled suspects during a knife-throwing act.

Cast
 Christopher Lee as Gregor ("Drago^)
 Leo Genn as Elliott
 Anthony Newlands as Barberini
 Heinz Drache as Carl
 Eddi Arent as Eddie
 Klaus Kinski as Manfred Hart
 Margaret Lee as Gina
 Suzy Kendall as Natasha, Drago's niece
 Cecil Parker as Sir John
 Victor Maddern as Mason
 Maurice Kaufmann as Mario
 Lawrence James as Manley
 Tom Bowman  as Jackson
 Skip Martin as Mr. Big
 Nosher Powell as Red 
 Gordon Petrie as Man
 Henry B. Longhurst as Hotel porter
 Dennis Blakely as Armoured van guard
 George Fisher as Fourth man
 Peter Brace as Speedboat man
 Roy Scammell as Speedboat man
 Geoff Silk as Security man
 Keith Peacock  as Security man
 John Carradine as Narrator

Release
The film premiered in Germany on 29 April 1966 and in the UK in November 1967.

Reception
The Radio Times wrote, "Christopher Lee wears a black woolly hood for nearly all of his scenes in this lame whodunnit, with minor horrific overtones...but the stalwart efforts of the cast including Klaus Kinski and Suzy Kendall act as a welcome safety net for the shaky plot" ; while Britmovie called it "fairly suspenseful."

See also
 Christopher Lee filmography

References

External links
 
 

1966 films
1960s crime thriller films
1960s mystery thriller films
British crime thriller films
British mystery thriller films
West German films
German mystery thriller films
1960s English-language films
English-language German films
Films based on works by Edgar Wallace
Films directed by John Llewellyn Moxey
Circus films
Films scored by Johnny Douglas
Constantin Film films
Films set in London
1960s British films
1960s German films